Levina Teerlinc (1510s – 23 June 1576) was a Flemish Renaissance miniaturist  who served as a painter to the English court of Henry VIII, Edward VI, Mary I and Elizabeth I. She was the most important miniaturist at the English court between Hans Holbein the Younger and Nicholas Hilliard. Her father, Simon Bening was a renowned book illuminator and miniature painter of the Ghent-Bruges school and probably trained her as a manuscript painter. She may have worked in her father's workshop before her marriage.

Biography
Teerlinc was born in Bruges, Flanders (which is now a part of Belgium) in the 1510s, one of five daughters of renowned miniaturist Simon Bening and granddaughter of Catherine van der Goes (closely related to Hugo van der Goes) and Alexander Bening. After marrying George Teerlinc of Blanckenberge in 1545, Teerlinc left for England, and is documented there by 1546, when she became court painter to the Tudor court, serving Henry VIII, Edward VI, Mary I, and Elizabeth I. She received an annual salary of £40 from 1546 until her death in 1576, as granted by Henry VIII and recorded by Lodovico Guicciardini (1567), which was more than was provided to Holbein.  She was the only female painter in the court of Henry VIII, although Catherine Parr was said to have employed three women miniature painters and these were Susannah Hornebolt, Levina Teerlinc and Margaret Holsewyther.
 
Queen Mary gave her a New Year's day gift of a gilt silver salt in 1556 and she gave the queen a small picture of the Trinity. In 1559 Teerlinc was appointed tutor in painting to the King's daughter at the Spanish Court. She and her husband had one son, Marcus. She died in Stepney, London on 23 June 1576.

Works

No surviving works have been confirmed as Teerlinc's. Yet she was one of the most well-documented artists at court in miniature painting, providing various portraits of Elizabeth I in the years 1559, 1562, 1563, 1564, 1567 ("a full-length portrait"), 1568 ("with Knights of the Order"), 1575 ("with other personages"), and 1576. She also painted for Mary I in 1556 as a New Year gift "a small picture of the trynitie". Teerlinc is best known for her pivotal position in the rise of the portrait miniature. She might have trained Nicholas Hilliard, by training a goldsmith, in the methods of miniature portraiture.

Attributing Teerlinc's works is challenging because she did not always sign them. However, there are a few existing paintings that are suspected to be Teerlinc's due to the fact she was the only active miniaturist of prominence in English court between Hans Holbein the Younger in 1543 and Nicholas Hilliard in the 1570s. Some scholars also speculate that many of the miniatures were lost in the fire at Whitehall.

A 1983 exhibition at the Victoria and Albert Museum represented "the first occasion when a group of miniatures has been assembled which can be attributed to Levina Teerlinc".  Since the exhibition also performed the same function for her predecessor as court miniaturist, Lucas Hornebolte, it was especially useful in developing consensus on attributions. Five miniatures and two illuminated manuscript sheets were in the group, including a miniature of Lady Katherine Grey from the V&A, and others from the Yale Center for British Art, the Royal Collection (both of these possibly of the young Elizabeth I, and private collections).  Strong considered there was "a convincing group of miniatures that emerge as the work of a single hand, one whose draughtsmanship is weak, whose paint is thin and transparent and whose brushwork loose".  She also probably designed the Great Seal of England for Mary I and the earliest one used by Elizabeth (in the 1540s).

Partial list of works
Levina Teerlinc, Portrait of Lady Katherine Grey, About 1555–60, Victoria and Albert Museum, Museum no. P.10-1979
Levina Teerlinc, Portrait of a Young Woman, 1566, Victoria and Albert Museum, Museum no. P.21-1954
Levina Teerlinc, Portrait of Mary Dudley, Lady Sidney, ca.1575, Victoria and Albert Museum, Museum no. E.1170-1988
Levina Teerlinc?, Portrait of Queen Mary I, Collection of the Duke of Buccleuch
Levina Teerlinc?, Portrait of a Young Woman, Collection of H.M. the Queen, Windsor Castle
Levina Teerlinc?, Portrait of Elizabeth I in State Robes, Collection of Welbeck Abbey

See also
Artists of the Tudor court
Women artists

Notes

References

Harris, Anne Sutherland and Linda Nochlin, Women Artists: 1550-1950, Los Angeles County Museum of Art, Knopf, New York, 1976.
Strong, Roy: Artists of the Tudor Court: The Portrait Miniature Rediscovered, 1520-1620, Victoria & Albert Museum exhibition catalogue, 1983, 

1510 births
Flemish portrait painters
Portrait miniaturists
Belgian women painters
16th-century births
1576 deaths
16th-century English women
Court painters
16th-century English painters
People from Stepney
Artists from Bruges
Belgian expatriates in England